India, officially the Republic of India is a country in South Asia. It is made up of 29 states and 8 union territories. 

A list of state flowers of India is given below. See Symbols of Indian states and territories for a complete list of all State characters and seals.

States

Union territories

See also
 Indian lotus, the national flower of India
 List of Indian state symbols
 List of Indian state flags
 List of Indian state emblems
 List of Indian state mottos
 List of Indian state songs
 List of Indian state foundation days
 List of Indian state animals
 List of Indian state birds
 List of Indian state trees

References

External links
Complete Reference for Indian flower collection
Complete Indian flower collection
Indian state flowers
Official flora and fauna of various states in India On Biodiversity of India wiki

State flowers
State flowers
Indian state
Flowers